Enrique Pérez de Guzmán y de Castilla, 2nd Count of Niebla (in full) (20 February 1391 – 31 October 1436) was a Spanish nobleman and military figure of the Reconquista. He drowned whilst attempting the Seventh Siege of Gibraltar.

Biography
He was the son of Juan Alonso de Guzmán and of Beatriz de Castilla y Ponce de León, Lady of Niebla (died 1409), an illegitimate daughter of Henry II of Castile and of Beatriz Ponce de León.

On 4 March 1405 he married Teresa Suárez de Figueroa y Orozco, Lady of Escamilla and Santa Olalla, daughter of Lorenzo Suarez de Figueroa, Master of the Military Order of Santiago, and of Maria de Orozco.

He transferred ownership of the Canary islands of El Hierro and Lanzarote to Hernan Peraza the Elder in 1430, a move that helped Peraza to unify the lordship of the Canary Islands and strengthen the Peraza family's footing during the islands' conquest.

The count drowned while besieging Gibraltar in October 1436. This was the Seventh Siege of Gibraltar then the isthmus was under the control of the Spanish Moors.

References

Sources

1391 births
1436 deaths
Counts of Spain
Enrique
14th-century Castilians
People of the Reconquista
Deaths by drowning
Deaths in Gibraltar